"Snow, Glass, Apples" is a 1994 short story written by Neil Gaiman. It was originally released as a benefit book for the Comic Book Legal Defense Fund and was reprinted in the anthology Love in Vein II, edited by Poppy Z. Brite.

Plot
The story retells the famous fairy tale of Snow White from the point of view of Snow White's stepmother, who is traditionally the villain of the piece. The stepmother is struggling desperately to save the kingdom from her unnatural and monstrous stepdaughter. Ultimately she is unsuccessful, as the "happy ending" of the original story still takes place despite her efforts to prevent it. The story incorporates themes of vampirism, incest, pedophilia, and necrophilia.

The stepmother has had magical powers from a very young age, including visions of the future. She marries a king and describes his daughter, Snow White, as a mysterious, vampiric young girl. The king ultimately dies from abuse, both physical and sexual, by six-year-old Snow White and leaves the stepmother to reign as queen. The stepmother has her huntsmen murder Snow White and cut out her heart, which still beats even after being removed and is hung in the queen's private chambers. Following large numbers of disappearances and murders in the kingdom, the queen uses magic and her own blood to create enchanted apples which she brings into the woods to a still-living Snow White.

The queen flees but knows that the creature ate the apples when Snow White's removed heart finally stops beating. Two years later, a prince visits the queen and she plans to marry him and unite their kingdoms. However, the queen is unable to sexually satisfy the prince, who is clearly a necrophiliac, and he leaves. On his way home, he encounters the dead body of Snow White being guarded by seven dwarves. Indulging his necrophilia, the prince rapes Snow White and unwittingly dislodges the piece of apple stuck in Snow White's throat, resurrecting her. The prince and Snow White return to the queen's kingdom and sentence her to death for witchcraft. The queen is incinerated in a kiln and the story is revealed to be her final thoughts as she begins to burn to death.

Publication
"Snow, Glass, Apples" was written in 1994, and was first published by Dreamhaven Press as benefit book for the Comic Book Legal Defense Fund. It was included in Gaiman's short story collection Smoke and Mirrors (1998).

The story  was adapted by the author into an audio drama, which was produced by Seeing Ear Theatre in 2001, starring Bebe Neuwirth. This was the second of two collaborations between Gaiman and Seeing Ear Theatre, following Murder Mysteries, and the two adaptations have been released together on CD under the title Two Plays for Voices. In 2012 it was adapted into a play by the Edinburgh University Theatre Company.

In 2019 it was adapted by Colleen Doran into a graphic novel published by Dark Horse Comics. The adaptation won the 2020 Eisner Award for Best Adaptation from Another Medium. The Horror Writers Association also presented the "Snow, Glass, Apples" graphic novel with the Bram Stoker Superior Achievement in a Graphic Novel Award.

See also
Red as Blood, or Tales from the Sisters Grimmer

References

1994 short stories
Works based on Snow White
Fantasy short stories
Literature based on fairy tales
Short stories by Neil Gaiman
Witchcraft in written fiction
Horror short stories
Vampires in written fiction
Pedophilia in literature
Incest in fiction
Dark Horse Comics graphic novels